Tertullian (155 AD –  220 AD) was a prolific early Christian author from Carthage in the Roman province of Africa. He was the first Christian author to produce an extensive corpus of Latin Christian literature. He was an early Christian apologist and a polemicist against heresy, including contemporary Christian Gnosticism. Tertullian has been called "the father of Latin Christianity" and "the founder of Western theology".

Tertullian originated new theological concepts and advanced the development of early Church doctrine. He is perhaps most famous for being the first writer in Latin known to use the term trinity (Latin: trinitas). 

However, Tertullian was never recognized as a saint by the Eastern or Western Catholic churches. Several of his teachings on issues such as the clear subordination of the Son and Spirit to the Father, as well as his condemnation of remarriage for widows and of fleeing from persecution, contradict the doctrines of these traditions, and his later rejection of orthodoxy for Montanism has led these communions to refrain from considering him a Church father, important ecclesiastical writer though he was.

Life 
Scant reliable evidence exists regarding Tertullian's life; most knowledge comes from passing references in his own writings. Roman Africa was famous as the home of orators, and that influence can be seen in his writing style with its archaisms or provincialisms, its glowing imagery and its passionate temper. He was a scholar with an excellent education. He wrote at least three books in Greek. In them, he refers to himself, but none of them is extant.

Some sources describe him as Berber. The linguist René Braun suggested that he was of Punic origin but acknowledged that it is difficult to decide since the heritage of Carthage had become common to the Berbers. Tertullian's own understanding of his ethnicity has been questioned. He referred to himself as Poenicum inter Romanos in his book De Pallio and claimed Africa as his patria. According to church tradition, Tertullian was raised in Carthage and was thought to be the son of a Roman centurion. Tertullian has been claimed to have been a trained lawyer and an ordained priest. Those assertions rely on the accounts of Eusebius of Caesarea, Church History, II, ii. 4, and Jerome's De viris illustribus (On famous men) chapter 53. Jerome claimed that Tertullian's father held the position of centurio proconsularis ("aide-de-camp") in the Roman army in Africa.

Further, Tertullian has been thought to be a lawyer, based on his use of legal analogies and on an identification of him with the jurist Tertullianus, who is quoted in the Pandects. Although Tertullian used a knowledge of Roman law in his writings, his legal knowledge does not demonstrably exceed what could be expected from a sufficient Roman education. The writings of Tertullianus, a lawyer of the same cognomen, exist only in fragments and do not explicitly denote a Christian authorship. Finally, any notion of Tertullian being a priest is also questionable. In his extant writings, he never describes himself as ordained in the church and seems to place himself among the laity.

His conversion to Christianity perhaps took place about 197–198 (cf. Adolf Harnack, Bonwetsch, and others), but its immediate antecedents are unknown except as they are conjectured from his writings. The event must have been sudden and decisive, transforming at once his own personality. He writes that he could not imagine a truly Christian life without such a conscious breach, a radical act of conversion: "Christians are made, not born" (Apol., xviii). Two books addressed to his wife confirm that he was married to a Christian wife.

In his middle life (about 207), he was attracted to the "New Prophecy" of Montanism, but today most scholars reject the assertion that Tertullian left the mainstream church or was excommunicated. "[W]e are left to ask whether Saint Cyprian could have regarded Tertullian as his master if Tertullian had been a notorious schismatic. Since no ancient writer was more definite (if not indeed fanatical) on this subject of schism than Saint Cyprian, the question must surely be answered in the negative."

In the time of Augustine, a group of "Tertullianists" still had a basilica in Carthage, which within the same period passed to the orthodox church. It is unclear whether the name was merely another for the Montanists or that it means that Tertullian later split with the Montanists and founded his own group.

Jerome says that Tertullian lived to old age. By the doctrinal works he published, Tertullian became the teacher of Cyprian and the predecessor of Augustine, who in turn became the chief founder of Latin theology.

Writings

General character 
Thirty-one works are extant, together with fragments of more. Some fifteen works in Latin or Greek are lost, some as recently as the 9th century (De Paradiso, De superstitione saeculi, De carne et anima were all extant in the now damaged Codex Agobardinus in 814 AD). Tertullian's writings cover the whole theological field of the timeapologetics against paganism and Judaism, polemics, polity, discipline, and morals, or the whole reorganization of human life on a Christian basis; they gave a picture of the religious life and thought of the time which is of great interest to the church historian.

Like other early Christian writers Tertullian used the term paganus to mean "civilian" as a contrast to the "soldiers of Christ". The motif of Miles Christi did not assume the literal meaning of participation in war until Church doctrines justifying Christian participation in battle were developed around the 5th century. In the 2nd-century writings of Tertullian, paganus meant a "civilian" who was lacking self-discipline. In De Corona Militis XI.V he writes:

Chronology and contents 
The chronology of his writings is difficult to fix with certainty. It is in part determined by the Montanistic views that are set forth in some of them, by the author's own allusions to this writing, or that, as antedating others (cf. Harnack, Litteratur ii.260–262), and by definite historic data (e.g., the reference to the death of Septimius Severus, Ad Scapulam, iv). In his work against Marcion, which he calls his third composition on the Marcionite heresy, he gives its date as the fifteenth year of the reign of Severus (Adv. Marcionem, i.1, 15) – which would be approximately 208.

The writings may be divided with reference to the two periods of Tertullian's Christian activity, the mainstream and the Montanist (cf. Harnack, ii.262 sqq.), or according to their subject matter. The object of the former mode of division is to show, if possible, the change of views Tertullian's mind underwent. Following the latter mode, which is of a more practical interest, the writings fall into two groups. Apologetic and polemic writings, like Apologeticus, De testimonio animae, the anti-Jewish Adversus Iudaeos, Adv. Marcionem, Adv. Praxeam, Adv. Hermogenem, De praescriptione hereticorum, and Scorpiace were written to counteract Gnosticism and other religious or philosophical doctrines. The other group consists of practical and disciplinary writings, e.g., De monogamia, Ad uxorem, De virginibus velandis, De cultu feminarum, De patientia, De pudicitia, De oratione, and Ad martyras.

Among his apologetic writings, the Apologeticus, addressed to the Roman magistrates, is a most pungent defense of Christianity and the Christians against the reproaches of the pagans, and an important legacy of the ancient Church, proclaiming the principle of freedom of religion as an inalienable human right and demanding a fair trial for Christians before they are condemned to death.

Tertullian was the first to disprove charges that Christians sacrificed infants at the celebration of the Lord's Supper and committed incest. He pointed to the commission of such crimes in the pagan world and then proved by the testimony of Pliny the Younger that Christians pledged themselves not to commit murder, adultery, or other crimes. He adduced the inhumanity of pagan customs such as feeding the flesh of gladiators to beasts. He argued that the gods have no existence and thus there is no pagan religion against which Christians may offend. Christians do not engage in the foolish worship of the emperors, that they do better: they pray for them, and that Christians can afford to be put to torture and to death, and the more they are cast down the more they grow; "the blood of the Christians is seed" (Apologeticum, 50). In the De Praescriptione he develops as its fundamental idea that, in a dispute between the Church and a separating party, the whole burden of proof lies with the latter, as the Church, in possession of the unbroken tradition, is by its very existence a guarantee of its truth.

The five books against Marcion, written in 207 or 208, are the most comprehensive and elaborate of his polemical works, invaluable for gauging the early Christian view of Gnosticism. Tertullian has been identified by Jo Ann McNamara as the person who originally invested the consecrated virgin as the “bride of Christ”, which helped to bring the independent virgin under patriarchal rule.

Manuscripts
The earliest manuscript (handwritten copy) of any of Tertullian's works dates to the eighth century, but most are of the fifteenth. There are five main collections of Tertullian's works, known as the Cluniacense, Corbeiense, Trecense, Agobardinum and Ottobonianus. Some of Tertullian's works are lost. All the manuscripts of the Corbeiense collection are also now lost, although the collection survives in early printed editions.

Theology

Specific teachings 
Tertullian's main doctrinal teachings are as follows:

God
Tertullian reserves the appellation God, in the sense of the ultimate originator of all things, to the Father, who made the world out of nothing through his Son, the Word, has corporeity though he is a spirit (De praescriptione, vii.; Adv. Praxeam, vii). However Tertullian used 'corporeal' only in the Stoic sense, to mean something with actual material existence, rather than the later idea of flesh.

Tertullian is often considered an early proponent of the Nicene doctrine, approaching the subject from the standpoint of the Logos doctrine, though he did not state the later doctrine of the immanent Trinity. In his treatise against Praxeas, who taught patripassianism in Rome, he used the words "trinity", "economy" (used in reference to the three persons), "persons", and "substance," maintaining the distinction of the Son from the Father as the unoriginate God, and the Spirit from both the Father and the Son (Adv. Praxeam, xxv). "These three are one substance, not one person; and it is said, 'I and my Father are one' in respect not of the singularity of number but the unity of the substance." The very names "Father" and "Son" indicate the distinction of personality. The Father is one, the Son is another, and the Spirit is another ("dico alium esse patrem et alium filium et alium spiritum" Adv. Praxeam, ix), and yet in defending the unity of God, he says the Son is not other ("alius a patre filius non est", Adv. Prax. 18) as a result of receiving a portion of the Father's substance. At times, speaking of the Father and the Son, Tertullian refers to "two gods". He says that all things of the Father belong also to the Son, including his names, such as Almighty God, Most High, Lord of Hosts, or King of Israel.

Though Tertullian considered the Father to be God (Yahweh), he responded to criticism of the Modalist Praxeas that this meant that Tertullian's Christianity was not monotheistic by noting that even though there was one God (Yahweh, who became the Father when the Son became his agent of creation), the Son could also be referred to as God, when referred to apart from the Father, because the Son, though subordinate to God, is entitled to be called God "from the unity of the Father" in regards to being formed from a portion of His substance. The Catholic Encyclopedia comments that for Tertullian, "There was a time when there was no Son and no sin, when God was neither Father nor Judge." Similarly J.N.D. Kelly stated: "Tertullian followed the Apologists in dating His 'perfect generation' from His extrapolation for the work of creation; prior to that moment God could not strictly be said to have had a Son, while after it the term 'Father', which for earlier theologians generally connoted God as author of reality, began to acquire the specialized meaning of Father of the Son." As regards the subjects of subordination of the Son to the Father, the New Catholic Encyclopedia has commented: "In not a few areas of theology, Tertullian’s views are, of course, completely unacceptable. Thus, for example, his teaching on the Trinity reveals a subordination of Son to Father that in the later crass form of Arianism the Church rejected as heretical." Though he did not fully state the doctrine of the immanence of the Trinity, according to B. B. Warfield, he went a long distance in the way of approach to it.

Apostolicity
Tertullian was a defender of the necessity of apostolicity. In his Prescription Against Heretics, he explicitly challenges heretics to produce evidence of the apostolic succession of their communities.

Eucharist 
Unlike many early Christian writers, Tertullian along with Clement of Alexandria used the word "figure" and "symbol" to define the Eucharist, Tertullian in his book Against Marcion implied that: "this is my body" should be interpreted as "a figure of my body". While others have also suggested that Tertullian believed in a spiritual presence in the Eucharist.

Baptism 
Tertullian advises the postponement of baptism of little children and the unmarried, he mentions that it was customary to baptise infants, with sponsors speaking on their behalf. He argued that an infant ran the risk of growing up and then falling into sin, which could cause them to lose their salvation, if they were baptized as infants.

Contrary to early Syrian baptismal doctrine and practice, Tertullian describes baptism as a cleansing and preparation process which precedes the reception of the Holy Spirit in post-baptismal anointing (De Baptismo 6). De Baptismo includes the earliest known mention of a prayer for the consecration of the waters of baptism. This invocation may suggest a change in practice from baptizing in living (or running) water, where the Spirit was believed to be present, to baptizing in still water.

Tertullian had an ex opere operato view of the baptism, thus the efficiency of baptism was not dependent upon the faith of the receiver. He also believed that in an emergency, the laity can give the baptism.

The Church 
Tertullian interpreted that in Matthew 16:18-19 the rock is referring to Peter. For Tertullian Peter is the type of the one Church and its origins, this Church, is now present in a variety of local churches. Tertullian also believed that the power to "bind and unbind" has passed from Peter to the apostles and prophets of the Montanist church, not the bishops. Tertullian mocked Pope Calixtus or Agrippinus (it is debated which one he was referring to) when he challenged him on the Church forgiving capital sinners and letting them back into the church.

Tertullian believed that the people who committed grave sins, such as sorcery, fornication and murder should not be let inside the church.

As a Montanist, Tertullian attacked the church authorities as more interested in their own political power in the church than in listening to the Spirit. Tertullian's criticism of Church authorities has been compared to the Protestant reformation.

Marriage 
Tertullian's view of marriage was heavily influenced by Montanism; in Tertullian's book Exhortation to Chastity, it can be seen that Tertullian had a huge shift in his views on marriage after becoming a Montanist. He had previously held marriage to be fundamentally good, but after his conversion he denied its goodness. Tertullian argues that marriage is considered to be good "when it's compared with the greatest of all evils". Tertullian argued that before the coming of Christ, the command to reproduce was a prophetic sign pointing to the coming of the Church; after it came, the command was superseded. Tertullian also believed lust for one's wife and for another woman were essentially the same, so that marital desire was similar to adulterous desire. Tertullian believed that sex even in marriage would disrupt the Christian life and that abstinence was the best way to achieve the clarity of the soul. Tertullian's views would later influence much of the western church.

Tertullian was the first to introduce a view of "sexual hierarchy": he believed that those who abstain from sexual relations should have a higher hierarchy in the church than those who do not, because he saw sexual relations as a barrier that stopped one from a close relationship with God.

Scripture 
Tertullian did not have a specific listing of the canon; however, he quotes 1 John, 1 Peter, Jude, Revelation, the Pauline epistles and the four Gospels. After Tertullian's conversion to Montanism, he also started to use the Shepherd of Hermas. Tertullian made no references to the book of Tobit, however in his book Adversus Marcionem he quotes the book of Judith. He quoted most of the Old Testament including many deuterocanonical books, however he never used the books of Chronicles, Ruth, Esther, 2 Maccabees, 2 John and 3 John. He defended the book of Enoch and he believed that the book was omitted by the Jews from the canon. He believed that the epistle to the Hebrews was made by Barnabas. For Tertullian scripture was authoritative, he used scripture as the primary source in almost every chapter of his every work, and very rarely anything else. He seems to prioritize the authority of scripture above anything else.

When interpreting Scripture, Tertullian would occasionally believe passages to be allegorical or symbolic, while in other places he would support a literal interpretation. Tertullian would especially use allegorical interpretations when dealing with Christological prophecies of the Old Testament. Tertullian's view of interpration also included the belief of the simplicity of scripture, he believed that scripture interprets itself, for Tertullian Scripture must be interpreted in the light of a greater number of texts and that they need to agree with each other.

Other beliefs 
Tertullian denied the perpetual virginity of Mary, and he was extensively quoted by Helvidius in his debate with Jerome. J.N.D. Kelly also argued that Tertullian believed that Mary had imperfections, thus denying her sinlessness. Tertullian held similar views as Antidicomarians.

Tertullian held to a view similar to the priesthood of all believers and that the distinction of the clergy and the laity is only because of ecclesiastical institution and thus in an absence of a priest the laity can act as priests; his theory on the distinction of the laity and clergy is influenced by Montanism and his early writings do not have the same beliefs.

Tertullian believed in Iconoclasm.

Tertullian believed in historic premillenialism: that Christians will go through a period of tribulation, to be followed by a literal 1000-year reign of Christ.

Tertullian attacked the use of Greek philosophy in Christian theology. For Tertullian, philosophy supported religious idolatry and heresy. Tertullian believed that many people became heretical because of relying on philosophy. Tertullian stated "What has Athens to do with Jerusalem?".

Tertullian's views of angels and demons were influenced by the Book of Enoch. Tertullian held that the Nephilim were born out of fallen angels who mingled with human women and had sexual relations. Tertullian believed that because of the actions of the watchers as described in the book of Enoch, men would later judge angels. He believed that angels are inferior to humans, and not made in the image of God. he believed that Angels are imperceptible to our senses, however they may choose to take on a human form or shape shift. 

Tertullian taught fideistic concepts such as the later philosophers William of Ockham and Søren Kierkegaard.

Montanism 
Tertullian was drawn to Montanism mainly because of its strict moral standards. Tertullian believed that the Church had forsaken the Christian way of life and entered a path of destruction. Montanism in North Africa seems to have been a counter-reaction against secularism. The form of Montanism in North Africa seems to have differed from the views of Montanus, and thus the North African Montanists believed bishops to be successors of the apostles, the New Testament to be the supreme authority on Christianity and they did not deny most doctrines of the Church.

Tertullianists 
Tertullianists were a group mentioned by Augustine, founded by Tertullian. There exists differences of opinion on Tertullianists, Augustine seems to have believed that Tertullian, soon after joining the Montanists, started his own sect derived from Montanism, while some scholars believe that Augustine was in error, and that Tertullianists was simply an alternative name of North African Montanism and not a separate sect.

Moral principles 

Tertullian was a determined advocate of strict discipline and an austere code of practise, and like many of the African fathers, one of the leading representatives of the rigorist element in the early Church. These views may have led him to adopt Montanism with its ascetic rigor and its belief in chiliasm and the continuance of the prophetic gifts. In his writings on public amusements, the veiling of virgins, the conduct of women, and the like, he gives expression to these views.

On the principle that we should not look at or listen to what we have no right to practise, and that polluted things, seen and touched, pollute (De spectaculis, viii, xvii), he declared a Christian should abstain from the theater and the amphitheater. There pagan religious rites were applied and the names of pagan divinities invoked; there the precepts of modesty, purity, and humanity were ignored or set aside, and there no place was offered to the onlookers for the cultivation of the Christian graces. Women should put aside their gold and precious stones as ornaments, and virgins should conform to the law of St. Paul for women and keep themselves strictly veiled (De virginibus velandis). He praised the unmarried state as the highest (De monogamia, xvii; Ad uxorem, i.3) and called upon Christians not to allow themselves to be excelled in the virtue of celibacy by Vestal Virgins and Egyptian priests. He even labeled second marriage a species of adultery (De exhortatione castitatis, ix), but this directly contradicted the Epistles of the Apostle Paul. Tertullian's resolve to never marry again and that no one else should remarry eventually led to his break with Rome because the orthodox church refused to follow him in this resolve. He, instead, favored the Montanist sect where they also condemned second marriage. One reason for Tertullian's disdain for marriage was his belief about the transformation that awaited a married couple. He believed that marital relations coarsened the body and spirit and would dull their spiritual senses and avert the Holy Spirit since husband and wife became one flesh once married.

Tertullian in modern days has been criticized as misogynistic, on the basis of the contents of his De Cultu Feminarum, section I.I, part 2 (trans. C.W. Marx): "Do you not know that you are Eve? The judgment of God upon this sex lives on in this age; therefore, necessarily the guilt should live on also. You are the gateway of the devil; you are the one who unseals the curse of that tree, and you are the first one to turn your back on the divine law; you are the one who persuaded him whom the devil was not capable of corrupting; you easily destroyed the image of God, Adam. Because of what you deserve, that is, death, even the Son of God had to die."

Tertullian had a radical view on the cosmos. He believed that heaven and earth intersected at many points and that it was possible that sexual relations with supernatural beings can occur.

Works 

Tertullian's writings are edited in volumes 1–2 of the Patrologia Latina, and modern texts exist in the Corpus Christianorum Latinorum. English translations by Sydney Thelwall and Philip Holmes can be found in volumes III and IV of the Ante-Nicene Fathers which are freely available online; more modern translations of some of the works have been made.

Apologetic
 Apologeticus pro Christianis.
 Libri duo ad Nationes.
 De Testimonio animae.
 Ad Martyres.
 De Spectaculis.
 De Idololatria.
 Accedit ad Scapulam liber.
Dogmatic
 De Oratione.
 De Baptismo.
 De Poenitentia.
 De Patientia.
 Ad Uxorem libri duo.
 De Cultu Feminarum lib. II.
Polemical
 De Praescriptionibus adversus Haereticos.
 De Corona Militis.
 De Fuga in Persecutione.
 Adversus Gnosticos Scorpiace.
 Adversus Praxeam.
 Adversus Hermogenem.
 Adversus Marcionem libri V.
 Adversus Valentinianos.
 Adversus Judaeos.
 De Anima.
 De Carne Christi.
 De Resurrectione Carnis.
On morality
 De velandis Virginibus.
 De Exhortatione Castitatis.
 De Monogamia.
 De Jejuniis.
 De Pudicitia.
 De Pallio.

Possible chronology
The following chronological ordering was proposed by John Kaye, Bishop of Lincoln in the 19th century:

Probably mainstream (Pre-Montanist):
 1. De Poenitentia (On Repentance)
 2. De Oratione (On Prayer)
 3. De Baptismo (On Baptism)
 4, 5. Ad Uxorem, lib. I & II, (To His Wife)
 6. Ad Martyras (To the Martyrs)
 7. De Patientia (On Patience)
 8. Adversus Judaeos (Against the Jews)
 9. De Praescriptione Haereticorum (On the Prescription of Heretics)

Indeterminate:
 10. Apologeticus pro Christianis (Apology for the Christians)
 11, 12. ad Nationes, lib. I & II (To the Nations)
 13. De Testimonio animae (On the Witness of the Soul)
 14. De Pallio (On the Ascetic Mantle)
 15. Adversus Hermogenem (Against Hermogenes)

Probably Post-Montanist:
 16. Adversus Valentinianus (Against the Valentinians)
 17. ad Scapulam (To Scapula, Proconsul of Africa)
 18. De Spectaculis (On the Games)
 19. De Idololatria (On Idolatry)
 20, 21. De cultu Feminarum, lib. I & II (On Women's Dress)

Definitely Post-Montanist:
 22. Adversus Marcionem, lib I (Against Marcion, Bk. I)
 23. Adversus Marcionem, lib II
 24. De Anima (On the Soul),
 25. Adversus Marcionem, lib III
 26. Adversus Marcionem, lib IV
 27. De Carne Christi (On the Flesh of Christ)
 28. De Resurrectione Carnis (On the Resurrection of Flesh)
 29. Adversus Marcionem, lib V
 30. Adversus Praxean (Against Praxeas)
 31. Scorpiace (Antidote to Scorpion's Bite)
 32. De Corona Militis (On the Soldier's Garland)
 33. De velandis Virginibus (On Veiling Virgins)
 34. De Exhortatione Castitatis (On Exhortation to Chastity)
 35. De Fuga in Persecutione (On Flight in Persecution)
 36. De Monogamia (On Monogamy)
 37. De Jejuniis, adversus psychicos (On Fasting, against the materialists)
 38. De Puditicia (On Modesty)

Spurious works 
There have been many works attributed to Tertullian in the past which have since been determined to be almost definitely written by others. Nonetheless, since their actual authors remain uncertain, they continue to be published together in collections of Tertullian's works.
 1 Adversus Omnes Haereses (Against all Heresies) – poss. Victorinus of Pettau
 2 De execrandis gentium diis (On the Execrable Gods of the Heathens)
 3 Carmen adversus Marcionem (Poem against Marcion)
 4 Carmen de Iona Propheta (Poem about the Prophet Jonas) – poss. Cyprianus Gallus
 5 Carmen de Sodoma (Poem about Sodom) – poss. Cyprianus Gallus
 6 Carmen de Genesi (Poem about Genesis)
 7 Carmen de Judicio Domini (Poem about the Judgment of the Lord)

The popular Passio SS. Perpetuae et Felicitatis (Martyrdom of SS. Perpetua and Felicitas), much of it presented as the personal diary of St. Perpetua, was once assumed to have been edited by Tertullian. That view is no longer widely held, and the work is usually published separately from Tertullian's own works.

Influence on Novatianism 
The Novatians refused forgiveness to idolaters or for people who committed other heinous sins, and made much use of the works of Tertullian, some Novatians even joined Montanists. The views of Novatian on the Trinity and Christology are also strongly influenced by Tertullian.

Ronald E. Heine writes, "With Novatianism we return to the spirit of Tertullian, and the issue of Christian discipline.

See also 
 Christian pacifism
 Credo quia absurdum
 Septimia gens
 Pseudo-Tertullian
 Tertulia
 Descriptions in antiquity of the execution cross

Notes

References

Bibliography

Further reading
 Ames, Cecilia. 2007. "Roman Religion in the Vision of Tertullian." In A Companion to Roman Religion. Edited by Jörg Rüpke, 457–471. Oxford: Blackwell.
 Dunn, Geoffrey D. 2004. Tertullian. New York: Routledge.
 Gero, Stephen. 1970. "Miles gloriosus: The Christians and Military Service according to Tertullian." Church History 39:285–298.
 Hillar, Marian. 2012. From Logos to Trinity. The Evolution of Religious Beliefs from Pythagoras to Tertullian. Cambridge, UK: Cambridge Univ. Press.
 Lane, Anthony N. S. 2002. "Tertullianus Totus Noster? Calvin’s use of Tertullian." Reformation and Renaissance Review 4:9–34.
 O’Malley, Thomas P. 1967. Tertullian and the Bible. Language, Imagery, Exegesis. Latinitas christianorum primaeva 21. Nijmegen, The Netherlands: Dekker & Van de Vegt.
 Otten, Willemien. 2009. "Views on Women in Early Christianity: Incarnational Hermeneutics in Tertullian and Augustine." In Hermeneutics, Scriptural Politics, and Human Rights. Between text and context. Edited by Bas de Gaay Fortman, Kurt Martens, and M. A. Mohamed Salih, 219–235. Basingstoke, UK: Palgrave Macmillan.
 
 Rankin, David. 1995. Tertullian and the Church. Cambridge, UK: Cambridge Univ. Press.
 Wilhite, David E. 2007. Tertullian the African. An Anthropological Reading of Tertullian’s Context and Identities. Millennium Studien 14. Berlin and New York: De Gruyter.

External links 

Primary sources
 Tertullian's works in many languages, including Latin, and English, website intratext.com.
 English translations of all Tertullian's works can be found in Rev. Alexander Roberts and James Donaldson, editors, 1867–1872, Ante-Nicene Christian Library: Translation of the Writings of the Fathers, Down to AD 325, Edinburgh: T&T Clark: Vol. 7 (Tertullian's Against Marcion), Vol. 11(Tertullian's Treatises, Pt. 1), Vol. 15 (Tertullian's Treatises, Pt.2), Vol. 18 (Tertullian's Treatises, Pt. 3)
 Works by Tertullian at Perseus Digital Library
 

Secondary sources
 EarlyChurch.org.uk Detailed bibliography and on-line articles.
 Jerome's On Famous Men Chapter 53 is devoted to Tertullian.
 
 
 The Tertullian Project, a site which provides all of Tertullian's works in Latin, translations in many languages, manuscripts etc.
 J. Kaye, Bishop of Lincoln (1845, third edition) The Ecclesiastical History of the Second and Third Centuries, illustrated from the writings of Tertullian. London: Rivington.
 

Carthage
Church Fathers
Converts to Christianity from pagan religions
Post–Silver Age Latin writers
Christian anti-Gnosticism
Ancient Christian anti-Judaism
Florens Tertullianus, Quintus
Christian pacifists
Christian ethicists
Ancient Christians involved in controversies
Christian apologists
Romans from Africa
Berber writers
Historians of the Catholic Church
Berber Christians
155 births
220 deaths
2nd-century Romans
3rd-century Romans
2nd-century Christian theologians
3rd-century Christian theologians
2nd-century Berber people
3rd-century Berber people
2nd-century Punic people
3rd-century Punic people
2nd-century Latin writers
3rd-century Latin writers
Marcionism
Montanism